Nils Olav Young Fearnley (14 December 1881 – 30 June 1961) was a Norwegian businessperson and landowner.

Personal life
He was born in Kristiania to the ship-owner Thomas Fearnley (1841–1927) and his wife Elisabeth Young (1854–1932).  He was the younger brother of Thomas Fearnley (1880–1961), grandson of romantic painter  Thomas Fearnley (1802-1842), paternal grandnephew of Carl Frederik Fearnley (1818-1890) and maternal grand-grandson of Nicolai Andresen (1781–1861).

Career
N. O. Young Fearnley  attended   Handelshochschule Leipzig in Leipzig, Germany. 
He later gained practical training in forestry and agriculture and wood pulp, paper and sawmill industry in Sweden and Norway as well as office practice at a wood processing company in London. He also spent learning years at the Jørgen Young properties near the village of  Hakadal at Nittedal in Akershus.   In 1906 he incorporated AS Meraker Brug as a forestry company after merging in the estates Forbygdgodset and Mostadmarka. 
He was the factory manager at Meraker Brug until 1912. 
In 1913, Fearnley acquired  farmland and woodland acreage with a sawmill at  Nannestad in Akershus. He also owned farmland  and forest acreage with sawmills  at Gjerstad  in Aust-Agder and Treungen in Telemark.
After 1919, he was a principally a landowner based at his estate Aas Gård in Hakadal.

  

Fearnley chaired  Papirindustriens arbeidsgiverforening and was a vice president of the Federation of Norwegian Industries. He chaired the supervisory council of Ringnes Bryggeri, was a board member of the Norwegian Employers' Confederation, Forsikringsselskapet Viking, Lillestrøms Cellulosefabrikk as well as Meraker Brug and Ranheim Papirfabrikk. 

Personal life
In 1906 he married Ingeborg Heiberg (1884-1974), a daughter of  diplomat and financier  Axel Heiberg (1848–1932). They were the parents of Thomas Young Fearnley (1906-1924), Ragnhild Fearnley (1908-1991) and 
Wanda Fearnley  (1915-1991) who was married to ship owner Dag Klaveness (1913–1986).

See also
Fearnley (Norwegian family)

References

1881 births
1961 deaths
Businesspeople from Oslo
People from Nittedal
Norwegian people of English descent
Norwegian expatriates in Germany
Norwegian company founders
Norwegian landowners
SK Fram members
Nils Olav